Albert Gallatin Edwards (October 15, 1812 – April 19, 1892) was an Assistant Secretary of the U.S. Treasury under President of the United States Abraham Lincoln and founder of brokerage firm A. G. Edwards.

Edwards was born in Kentucky in 1812 and named after Secretary of the Treasury Albert Gallatin.  His father was Illinois Governor and U.S. Senator, Ninian Edwards. He graduated from West Point and was stationed near St. Louis, MO.  There he met Louise Cabanne, the daughter of a prominent St. Louis Family, whom he married in 1835.  Following his marriage, Edwards resigned from the military and entered the wholesale business.

Edwards fought for the Union during the American Civil War and was rewarded for his effort by President Lincoln who named him United States Assistant Secretary of the Treasury in April, 1865.  Later, in 1887, at the age of 75, he founded the brokerage firm that bore his name, A. G. Edwards, which was absorbed into Wachovia in 2007. He is buried at Bellefontaine Cemetery in St. Louis.

References

1812 births
1892 deaths
United States Military Academy alumni
Union Army soldiers
United States Assistant Secretaries of the Treasury
19th-century American businesspeople